Pekka Lattunen (born 26 June 1938) is a Finnish speed skater. He competed in the men's 500 metres at the 1964 Winter Olympics.

References

1938 births
Living people
Finnish male speed skaters
Olympic speed skaters of Finland
Speed skaters at the 1964 Winter Olympics
Sportspeople from Leningrad Oblast